The Town of Île-Perrot (French/official name: Ville de l'Île-Perrot) is a town and municipality on Île Perrot in southwestern Quebec, Canada. The population as of the Canada 2016 Census was 10,756. The town is at the western end of Lake Saint-Louis, and borders the local island communities of Terrasse-Vaudreuil, Pincourt and Notre-Dame-de-l'Île-Perrot. It also includes Dowker Island and the small Claude and Bellevue Islands (Île Claude and Île Bellevue).

History
The island was granted on October 29, 1672, to François-Marie Perrot (1644-1691), captain in the Picardy Regiment and governor of Montreal in 1670. In 1786, the place received its first parish priest.

In 1845, the Municipality of l'Isle-Perrot was founded, abolished in 1847, and re-established in 1855 as the Parish Municipality of Sainte-Jeanne-Chantal-de-l'Isle-Perrot (partially taking the name of the Sainte-Jeanne-Chantal Parish established there in 1832). In 1946, its name was changed to L'Île-Perrot, and in 1955, it changed statutes from parish municipality to ville.

In 1949, L'Île-Perrot greatly reduced in size when a large part of its territory was split off to form the new Parish Municipality of Notre-Dame-de-l'Île-Perrot.

Demographics 

Local government
List of former mayors:

 Ludger Stocker (1955)
 Florian Bleau (1955–1973)
 Marcel Rainville (1973–1977)
 René Émard (1977–1981)
 Pierre Bleau (1981–1989)
 Michel Martin (1989–1990)
 Claude Girouard (1990–1993)
 François Grégoire (1993–1997)
 Marc Roy (1997–2017)
 Pierre Séguin (2017–present)

Transportation
Autoroute 20 runs through the town, with three at-grade intersections serving as exits. The east side of L'Île-Perrot is bordered by a branch of the Ottawa River with a crossing via Autoroute 20 over the Galipeault Bridge (Pont Galipeault) to Sainte-Anne-de-Bellevue on Montreal Island.

There is a shuttle bus service operated by CIT La Presqu'Île connecting to the Île-Perrot station on the Vaudreuil-Hudson commuter rail line.

Education
There are 3 francophone elementary schools (Virginie Roy, François-Perrot and La Perdriolle) and an adult education centre in L'Île-Perrot, all run by the Commission Scolaire des Trois-Lacs.

Lester B. Pearson School Board operates Anglophone schools. The community is zoned to Dorset Elementary School in Baie-d'Urfé.

See also
 List of cities in Quebec

References

External links

 Ville de l'Île-Perrot official website

Cities and towns in Quebec
Greater Montreal
Incorporated places in Vaudreuil-Soulanges Regional County Municipality